In enzymology, a 3-methylquercetin 7-O-methyltransferase is an enzyme that catalyzes the chemical reaction

S-adenosyl-L-methionine + 5,7,3',4'-tetrahydroxy-3-methoxyflavone  S-adenosyl-L-homocysteine + 5,3',4'-trihydroxy-3,7-dimethoxyflavone

Thus, the two substrates of this enzyme are S-adenosyl methionine and 5,7,3',4'-tetrahydroxy-3-methoxyflavone (isorhamnetin), whereas its two products are S-adenosylhomocysteine and 5,3',4'-trihydroxy-3,7-dimethoxyflavone (rhamnazin).

This enzyme belongs to the family of transferases, specifically those transferring one-carbon group methyltransferases.  The systematic name of this enzyme class is S-adenosyl-L-methionine:5,7,3',4'-tetrahydroxy-3-methoxyflavone 7-O-methyltransferase. Other names in common use include flavonol 7-O-methyltransferase, flavonol 7-methyltransferase, 7-OMT, S-adenosyl-L-methionine:3',4',5,7-tetrahydroxy-3-methoxyflavone, 7-O-methyltransferase, and 3-methylquercitin 7-O-methyltransferase [mis-spelt].

The enzyme can be found in Chrysosplenium americanum  (American Golden Saxifrage).

References

 

EC 2.1.1
Enzymes of unknown structure